Mojo was a newspaper based in Harlem, New York City. The first issue was published in 1968. Poet Julian Ellison, was editor of Mojo.  As a new and independent publication, Mojo was "an organ of the Black Student Congress".

References

Publications established in 1968
Defunct African-American newspapers
Defunct newspapers published in New York City
1968 establishments in New York City
Harlem